The Teddy Award is an international film award for films with LGBT topics, presented by an independent jury as an official award of the Berlin International Film Festival (the Berlinale). For the most part, the jury consists of organisers of gay and lesbian film festivals, who view films screened in all sections of the Berlinale; films do not have to have been part of the festival's official competition stream to be eligible for Teddy awards. Subsequently, a list of films meeting criteria for LGBT content is selected by the jury, and a 3,000-Euro Teddy is awarded to a feature film, a short film and a documentary.

At the 66th Berlin International Film Festival in 2016, a dedicated "Teddy30" lineup of classic LGBT-related films was screened as a full program of the festival to celebrate the award's 30th anniversary.

History

In 1987 German filmmakers Wieland Speck and Manfred Salzgeber formed a jury called the International Gay & Lesbian Film Festival Association (IGLFFA) to create an award for LGBT films. It was originally named the Teddy Bear Award, in accordance with the Berlinale's main awards being named as the Golden and Silver Bear; the name was later shortened to Teddy Award, although the statuette presented to winners is still shaped like a teddy bear.

The first Teddy Award was given to Pedro Almodóvar for his film La ley del deseo, which featured Antonio Banderas.

The awards were originally founded in a gay bookshop in West Berlin, they were named after the cuddly toys which were sent as prizes to the winners.
They were then upgraded to metal trophies but are still thought to be a deliberate parody of the main Berlin Film Festival’s Golden Bear trophy.

1990 was the first bigger festival in the LGBT centrum SchwuZ in Berlin with around 400 guests. The evening was organized from BeV StroganoV and workers of the bookstore Eisenherz in Berlin. In 1992 the award was officially made part of the Berlin International Film Festival. In 1997 TEDDY e.V., a non-profit organisation was founded, which lobbied the award.

Categories
There are three main categories in which the award is given:
 feature film
 documentary
 short film

One additional film is singled out for a Jury Award. A Special Award is commonly, but not always, given to one or more individuals for a distinguished achievement in LGBT cinema, such as a career lifetime achievement as a director or performer, or for a person's role in a project of significance to the history of LGBT cinema.

The German LGBT magazine  formerly sponsored an award which was given to a film selected by a panel of the magazine's readers. This was discontinued after 2012, but was reinstituted in 2016 under the new sponsorship of the magazine ; in 2017, the award was named the Harvey in honour of Harvey Milk.

Winners

Notes

Award reasonale

Other nominees

See also
 Frameline Audience Award for Best Feature, an award of the Frameline Film Festival 
 Queer Lion, an award of the Venice International Film Festival
 Queer Palm, an award of the Cannes Film Festival
 Sebastiane Award, an award of the San Sebastián International Film Festival

References

Sources

External links

 
 Film database at Teddy Award (English)

Berlin International Film Festival
LGBT film awards
German film awards
LGBT culture in Germany